Joseph Gerald McIntyre (born 19 June 1971) is an English former professional footballer who played as a full-back.

Career statistics
Source:

References

1971 births
Living people
People from Blackley
Footballers from Manchester
English footballers
Association football fullbacks
Manchester United F.C. players
Port Vale F.C. players
Rochdale A.F.C. players
English Football League players